The 2010 LKL All-Star Game, was held in Cido Arena, on March 20, 2010.

Roster 

 Replaced by Tadas Klimavičius.

Statistics

Coaches 
The coach of Team Vilkai was Rimas Kurtinaitis, of Lietuvos Rytas, who received 5,490 votes. The coach of Team Ereliai was Antanas Sireika, of Šiauliai, with 3,005 votes.

Other events

All-Star 3-point shootout

The leading scorer in 3-point percentage of the LKL was Donatas Zavackas. Besides him, one player, usually with a good 3-point percentage, was chosen from every team in the league. Below is the list of participating players. The winner received the trophy, a prize and a 4,000 Litas check.

All-Star dunk contest

External links 
 LKL.com

Lietuvos krepšinio lyga All-Star Game
2009–10 LKL season